Himig Handog (Eng: A Musical Offering) is a multimedia songwriting and music video competition in the Philippines based in Quezon City. The competition is operated by ABS-CBN Corporation and the media conglomerate's music subsidiary Star Music. The contest ran from 2000 to 2003 and was later revived in 2013. The theme of the contest has been love songs since 2002.

Since its revival, it is popularly regarded as "the country's premier songwriting contest" with Pinoy songwriters and composers submitting thousands of original compositions annually, and the country's top singers interpreting the songs in a live event.

History
Himig Handog was first established in 2000. To date, it only had held five competitions which were in 2000, 2001, 2002, 2003 and in 2013. Each year, the title and theme of the contest changes. In 2000, the contest was titled as Himig Handog sa Bayang Pilipino which was held on October 1. During the second, third and fourth contests' themes and titles were JAM: Makabagong Kabataan, Love Songs and Love Songs 2 respectively.

From 2001 to 2003, only three songs were rewarded with varying amounts of financial incentives(cash prizes) depending on which entry came in first, second, and third. However, in 2013, the amount of incentives given were raised to five to make up a 'Top Five'. Other award categories were also introduced during this year. Also, it introduced a music video contest where participating tertiary institutions across the country were given the challenge of producing and directing the music videos for each song entry under a certain budget.

Himig Handog sa Bayaning Pilipino (2000)
Date: October 2000
Venue: Meralco Theater, Pasig City
Hosts: Pops Fernandez, Cris Villonco, and Mari Kaimo

The competition was judged by Jim Paredes, Andrea Veneracion, Jimmy Santiago, Ely Buendia, Willy Cruz, Fr. Nilo Tanalega, Emmie Domingo, Gerard Salonga, Sandy Prieto-Romualdez, Charo Santos-Concio, Freddie M. Garcia, Eugenio Lopez III, and Ryan Cayabyab as its chairman.

JAM: Himig Handog sa Makabagong Kabataan (2001)
Venue: Eugenio Lopez, Jr. Communications Center, Quezon City
Hosts: Ryan Agoncillo, Jodi Sta. Maria, Pops Fernandez

The competition ended with "Tara Tena" by Jonathan Manalo (interpreted by Kyla, Kaya, and V3) as the grand winner. Special awards were awarded also with "Si Eddie" by Laarnie Matta "Lani" Macaraeg and Luz Ching "Luchi" Pumarega (interpreted by Dingdong Avanzado) winning all choice awards: Netsurfers Choice Awards, WRR 101.9 For Life Listeners Choice Awards, and Chalk and StarStudio Readers Choice Awards.

The competition was judged by Chito Miranda, Bombie Balquiedra, Romina Oraa, Bobby Garcia, Jimmy Bondoc, Bituin Escalante, Nandy Vilar, Cholo Laurel, Cris Villonco, Reuben Laurente, Carlos Agassi, Rico Blanco, and Ryan Cayabyab as its chairman.

Himig Handog Love Songs (2002)
Venue: ABS-CBN Studio 10
Hosts: Jericho Rosales, Kristine Hermosa, Ryan Agoncillo, and Desiree del Valle

The competition was judged by Raul Castro, Manny Gabling, Dero Pedero, Moy Ortiz, Edith Gallardo, Audie Gemora, Ely Buendia, Vina Morales, Vehnee Saturno, Rey Valera, and Ryan Cayabyab as its chairman.

Himig Handog Love Songs 2 (2003)

Himig Handog Pinoy Pop Love Songs: Mga Awit at Kwento ng Pusong Pilipino (2013)
Date: February 24, 2013
Venue: SM Mall of Asia Arena
Hosts: Xian Lim, Kim Chiu, Matteo Guidicelli and Megan Young

The theme of the 2013 contest was P-Pop Love Songs: Mga Awit at Kwento ng Pusong Pilipino  (lit. P-Pop Love Songs: The Songs and Stories of Filipino Hearts). It was held at the Mall of Asia Arena on February 24, 2013. The competition consists of twelve finalists selected from the 2,500 songs submitted during the auditions.

The competition ended with "Anong Nangyari Sa Ating Dalawa" as the first place by Jovinor Tan (interpreted by Aiza Seguerra). Also, on second place was "Hanggang Wakas" by Soc Villanueva (interpreted by Juris Fernandez); third place was "If You Ever Change Your Mind",  which was sung and composed Marion Aunor; fourth place was "Scared to Death" by Domingo Rosco Jr. and sung by KZ Tandingan; and fifth place was "Kahit Na" by Julius James de Belen and interpreted by Toni Gonzaga.

Meanwhile, the song "Nasa Iyo na ang Lahat" by Jungee Marcelo which was sung by Daniel Padilla won special awards. These include MOR Listener's Choice, Tambayan 101.9 Listener's Choice, Star Records CD Buyer's Choice and the MYX Choice for Best Video.

The competition was judged by Jim Paredes, Louie Ocampo, Olivia Lamasan, August Benitez, Jett Pangan, Freddie Aguilar, Cory Vidanes, Freddie M. Garcia, Jed Madela, Sarah Geronimo and Ogie Alcasid as its chairman.   Special guests Anna Fegi, Bituin Escalante, and Martin Nievera performed a Finale production number representing the past winners of the competition.

NOTE: All Tagalog titles are enclosed with English translations.

Special awards:

MOR Listener's Choice; Tambayan 101.9 Listener's Choice; Star Records CD Buyer's Choice; MYX Choice for Best Video

TFC's Choice Award

Himig Handog Pinoy pop Love Songs (2014)
Date: September 28, 2014
Venue: Smart Araneta Coliseum

This year's contest was titled "Himig Handog P-Pop Love Songs" and was held at the Smart Araneta Coliseum on September 28, 2014, where the interpreters performed their songs with an orchestra conducted by Gerard Salonga. The event was hosted by Kim Chiu, Xian Lim, Alex Gonzaga and Robi Domingo. The studio versions of the songs were performed by the interpreters live at the morning lifestyle TV show Kris TV and on Sunday noontime variety show ASAP 19 ahead of the grand-finals night.

Special awards:

Himig Handog Pinoy pop Love Songs (2016)
The Top 15 finalists of the 2016 Himig Handog P-Pop Love Songs was released on January 13, 2016. The grand finals night was held at the Kia Theatre on April 24, 2016, and aired on ABS-CBN's "Sunday's Best". This was hosted by Kathryn Bernardo, Enrique Gil, Liza Soberano and Robi Domingo. "Dalawang Letra", a song entry composed by Pinoy Dream Academy alumnus Davey Langit and interpreted by Itchyworms band was named as the grand winner, while the song "O Pag-Ibig", composed by Honlani Rabe and Jack Rufo and interpreted by Ylona Garcia and Bailey May bagged the most number of special awards.

Special Awards:
 MOR 101.9 Choice Award - O Pag-Ibig by Bailey May and Ylona Garcia
 TFC's Global Choice Award - O Pag-Ibig by Bailey May and Ylona Garcia
 One Music Philippines Favorite Interpreter Choice Award - O Pag-Ibig by Bailey May and Ylona Garcia  
 MYX Best Music Video Choice Award - O Pag-Ibig by Bailey May and Ylona Garcia
 Star Music Choice Award - Nyebe by Kaye Cal

Himig Handog (2017)
The Top 10 finalists of the Himig Handog 2017 was released on September 10, 2017. The grand finals day was held on ASAP on November 26, 2017, on ABS-CBN. "Titibo-Tibo", a song entry composed by Libertine Amistoso and interpreted by Moira Dela Torre was named as the grand winner, while the song "Tayo na Lang Kasi", composed by Soc Villanueva and interpreted by Kyla and Jason Dy bagged the most number of special awards.

Special Awards:
 MOR 101.9 Choice Award - Tayo na Lang Kasi by Kyla and Jason Dy
 TFC's Global Choice Award - Wow na Feelings by Janella Salvador
 One Music Philippines Favorite Interpreter Choice Award - Tayo na Lang Kasi by Kyla and Jason Dy
 MYX Best Music Video Choice Award - Tayo na Lang Kasi by Kyla and Jason Dy
 Star Music Choice Award - The Labo Song by Kaye Cal

Himig Handog (2018)
The Top 10 finalists of the Himig Handog 2018 was released on September 25, 2018, and on September 26, 2018, they revealed their interpreters. The grand finals day was held on ASAP on November 11, 2018, on ABS-CBN. This was also the last episode of ASAP prior to its reformat into ASAP Natin 'To in the following week after the entry of Regine Velasquez as a main host.

Unlike in previous years, a competition between universities and colleges for the best music video production was not held.

Special Awards:
 MOR 101.9 Choice Award - Sugarol by Maris Racal
 TFC's Global Choice Award - Sugarol by Maris Racal
 One Music Philippines Favorite Interpreter Choice Award - Wala Kang Alam by Sam Mangubat
 MYX Best Music Video Choice Award - Sugarol by Maris Racal
 Star Music Choice Award - Mas Mabuti Pa by Janine Berdin
 Producer's Award - Tinatapos Ko Na by Jona

Himig Handog (2019)
The Top 12 finalists of the Himig Handog 2019 was released on June 24, 2019, while the interpreters were revealed on July 26, 2019. The grand finals day was held on ASAP Natin 'To on October 13, 2019, on ABS-CBN.

Special Awards:
 Listeners' Choice Award - Mabagal by Daniel Padilla and Moira Dela Torre
 MOR 101.9 Choice Award - Mabagal by Daniel Padilla and Moira Dela Torre
 One Music Philippines Favorite Interpreter Choice Award - Mabagal by Daniel Padilla and Moira Dela Torre
 MYX Best Music Video Choice Award - Mabagal by Daniel Padilla and Moira Dela Torre
 Star Music Choice for Best Produced Track - Mabagal by Daniel Padilla and Moira Dela Torre

Himig Handog (2020)
This year, among the 3,000 of compositions submitted, the Top 12 finalists of the Himig Handog 2020 was announced on September 26, 2020, via ABS-CBN social media platforms and the interpreters were revealed on October 24, 2020.
The music videos for all songs were released on January 2, 2021.

The grand finals night was held on March 21, 2021, at the ABS-CBN Studio 10 (the studio used for ASAP). It was hosted by Jayda, Edward Barber and Jona. The competition was judged by Erik Santos, Jazz Nicolas, Aldrin Cerrado, Arnold "DJ Popoy" De La Cruz, Moy Ortiz, Regine Velasquez-Alcasid, and Eloisa Matias as its chairman.

Because of the restrictions caused by the ongoing COVID-19 pandemic in the Philippines, the grand finals night was held without a live audience, and was streamed on KTX.ph with a delayed telecast on Sunday's Best, while the organizers, artists, and crew followed quarantine periods, enforced swab test requirements, maintained distancing protocols and followed all health and safety procedures to ensure their safety and good health.

Special Awards:
 TikTok's Choice Award - Tabi Tabi Po by JMKO
 MOR's Choice Award - Tinadhana Sa'yo by Zephanie
 TFC's Global Choice Award - Tinadhana Sa'yo by Zephanie
 MYX Choice for Best Music Video Award - Marupok by KZ Tandingan
 Most Streamed Song - Kahit Kunwari Man Lang by Moira Dela Torre and Agsunta

Himig Handog (2022)

See also
ABS-CBN Corporation
Star Music
Original Pilipino Music

References

"#BuhayKolehiyo : #HimigHandog2014" Mj Lising Pineda. September 1, 2014.

External links
Official website
Himig Handog on Facebook

Star Music
Music events in the Philippines
Song contests
Recurring events established in 2000
Events in Metro Manila
2000 establishments in the Philippines
Assets owned by ABS-CBN Corporation